Doug Bailey  (born 6 December 1971) is a former Australian rules footballer who played with St Kilda in the Australian Football League (AFL).

Originally pursuing a career in Rowing, Doug represented the Mercantile Rowing Club and was selected for Victoria in the Kings Cup in 1991. Representing Victoria in Football in the same year and unable to manage both sports at the elite level, AFL football was chosen. Bailey was selected by St Kilda with pick 33 in the 1994 Pre-Season Draft. The utility made 10 appearances in the 1994 AFL season, before succumbing to injury. Following surgery and a long period of absence, his only other appearance came the following year. Following his retirement from St Kilda, he played in the SANFL with club Woodville West Torrens (50 games).

After completing a Bachelor of Education (top 15% of graduates) and Masters of Education, Doug commenced a successful career in Education. Commencing at Christian Brothers College - Adelaide as Director of Rowing, then as Deputy Head of Campus - King Island Ballarat and Clarendon College. In 2008 Doug was appointed the Foundation Head of Campus - Berwick Grammar. In 2012 Doug was appointed to the position Principal St Margaret's School - Berwick Grammar School. Under his stewardship the schools thrived, reaching their highest ever enrolments and highest ever academic performance. In 2017 Doug accepted the position of Head of Middle School and Senior Deputy at Haileybury College - Australia's top rated school. In addition to this, Doug has taught at Monash University (2017) in the Education Department.

In a voluntary capacity Doug is an AFL commissioner representing the ASFLSE (South East) and currently Chairs the South East Juniors (SEJ) and is a League Commissioner sitting on the AFLSE Advisory Committee. Under his governance there has been unprecedented positive change in AFL participation, overseeing the introduction of Women's Football. Keeping kids active, healthy and engaged in community sport is one of Doug's greatest passions.

References

External links
 
 

1971 births
Australian rules footballers from Victoria (Australia)
St Kilda Football Club players
Old Xaverians Football Club players
Living people